The Australasian Performing Right Association Awards of 2016 (generally known as APRA Awards) are a series of related awards which include the APRA Music Awards, Art Music Awards, and Screen Music Awards. The APRA Music Awards of 2016 was the 34th annual ceremony by the Australasian Performing Right Association (APRA) and the Australasian Mechanical Copyright Owners Society (AMCOS) to award outstanding achievements in contemporary songwriting, composing and publishing. The ceremony was held on 5 April 2016 at the Carriageworks, Sydney. The host for the ceremony was Brian Nankervis, adjudicator on SBS-TV's RocKwiz.

The Art Music Awards were distributed on 16 August at the Plaza Ballroom, Melbourne and presented by APRA and the Australian Music Centre (AMC), "to recognise achievement in the composition, performance, education and presentation of Australian art music. Art music covers activity across contemporary classical music, contemporary jazz and improvised music, experimental music and sound art."

The Screen Music Awards were issued on 8 November by APRA, AMCOS and Australian Guild of Screen Composers (AGSC), which "acknowledges excellence and innovation in the genre of screen composition" and the ceremony was held at the City Recital Hall in Sydney.

On 15 March nominations for the APRA Music Awards were announced on multiple news sources; Jarryd James and Sia received four each. At the ceremony total of 14 awards were presented, including a new category, Overseas Recognition Award. Cold Chisel members (Jimmy Barnes, Don Walker, Ian Moss, Phil Small and Steve Prestwich) were honoured by the Ted Albert Award for Outstanding Services to Australian Music. Songwriter of the Year was Courtney Barnett.

Presenters

At the APRA Music Awards ceremony on 5 April 2016, aside from the host, Brian Nankervis, the presenters were Styalz Fuego, Fiona Bevan, Catherine Britt, Trey Campbell, Suze DeMarchi, Tim Rogers, Maegan Cottone, Adalita and Don Walker.

Performances

The APRA Music Awards ceremony showcased performances by:
 Urthboy with Kira Puru and Bertie Blackman
 The Delta Riggs
 D.I.G with Ngaiire
 Gang of Youths and Montaigne
 San Cisco
 Guy Sebastian
 The Living End

APRA Music Awards

Blues & Roots Work of the Year

Breakthrough Songwriter of the Year

Country Work of the Year

Dance Work of the Year

International Work of the Year

Most Played Australian Work

Most Played Australia Work Overseas

Overseas Recognition Award

Pop Work of the Year

Rock Work of the Year

Song of the Year

Songwriter of the Year

Courtney Barnett

Ted Albert Award for Outstanding Services to Australian Music

Cold Chisel (Jimmy Barnes, Don Walker, Ian Moss, Phil Small, Steve Prestwich)

Urban Work of the Year

Art Music Awards

Instrumental Work of the Year

Jazz Work of the Year

Orchestral Work of the Year

Vocal / Choral Work of the Year

Performance of the Year

Award for Excellence by an Individual

Award for Excellence by an Organisation

Award for Excellence in Music Education

Award for Excellence in a Regional Area

Award for Excellence in Experimental Music

Award for Excellence in Jazz

Distinguished Services to Australian Music

Screen Music Awards

Feature Film Score of the Year

Best Music for an Advertisement

Best Music for Children's Television

Best Music for a Documentary

Best Music for a Mini-Series or Telemovie

Best Music for a Short Film

Best Music for a Television Series or Serial

Best Original Song Composed for the Screen

Best Soundtrack Album

Best Television Theme

Most Performed Screen Composer – Australia

Most Performed Screen Composer – Overseas

References

2016 in Australian music
2016 music awards
APRA Awards